Gemmula antedenticulata is an extinct species of sea snail, a marine gastropod mollusk in the family Turridae, the turrids.

Description

Distribution
Fossils of this marine species have been found in Oligocene strata in Aquitaine, France.

References

 Lozouet P. (2017). Les Conoidea de l'Oligocène supérieur (Chattien) du bassin de l'Adour (Sud-Ouest de la France). Cossmanniana. 19: 3–180.

antedenticulata
Gastropods described in 2017